The Misurinellidae is an extinct taxonomic family of sea snails, marine gastropod mollusks in the informal group Lower Heterobranchia.

Genera
Genera within the family Misureinellidae include:
 Misurinella Bandel, 1994, the type genus

References 

 The Taxonomicon